The House at 20 Aurora Street in the village of Moravia in Cayuga County, New York is a historic house listed on the National Register of Historic Places.  It is a two-story, vernacular frame dwelling constructed about 1840, with an extension to the ell added about 1860.   Also on the property is a two-story Greek Revival style carriage house probably added about 1850.

It was listed on the National Register in 1995.

References

External links

Houses on the National Register of Historic Places in New York (state)
Greek Revival houses in New York (state)
Houses in Cayuga County, New York
National Register of Historic Places in Cayuga County, New York
Moravia (village), New York